Passion Pictures is a British film production company established by Andrew Ruhemann in 1987. The company has studios in London, Melbourne, Paris, Toronto, and New York City.

Film production
The company's core business is in commercial and animation output, which includes work for Cartoon Network, music videos for Gorillaz, and the Compare the Market.com commercial campaign featuring Aleksandr Orlov (meerkat). Passion Australia produced The Lost Thing, directed by Andrew Ruhemann and Shaun Tan, which won an Academy Award for Best Animated Short Film in 2011.

The department's first film, One Day in September, won an Academy Award in 2000. They have since been involved in the 2013 Oscar-winning Searching for Sugar Man, 2015's Listen to Me Marlon and 2016's Oscar-nominated Pear Cider and Cigarettes.

In 2017, the company produced the Netflix docuseries Five Came Back based on the book by Mark Harris. They also work on 101 Dalmatian Street. Its Passion Planet subsidiary produces nature documentaries such as The Serengeti Rules.

Passion Animation Studios created several promotional cinematic for the computer game League of Legends.

In 2020, Passion Paris placed second at the Berlin Music Video Awards in the Best Animation category for S+C+A+R+R - ''The Rest Of My Days'' music video. In 2021, the production company received two nominations for Best Animation by the Berlin Music Video Awards, for their work on the music video ''I Had To Leave'' by S+C+A+R+R and ''Moving Men'' by MYD. Passion Pictures produced the 2021 documentary Sir Alex Ferguson: Never Give In.

References

External links
 
 The Brit 50 on Screen Daily

British animation studios
Film production companies of the United Kingdom
Mass media companies established in 1987
1987 establishments in the United Kingdom